Operation Brushwood was a part of Operation Torch, Allied landings in Africa during World War II.

Taking place on 8 November 1942, the landings were intended to capture Fedhala as part of a larger operation to capture Casablanca in Morocco, 12 miles south of Fedhala.

Operation Brushwood forces landed in Fedhala, Morocco, then marched to nearby Casablanca.

A total of 19,364 officers and men were involved in the attack. Three regimental landing groups (RLGs) from the 7th, 15th, and 30th Infantry Regiments of the 3rd Infantry Division.

Objectives 
The main goal was to capture the town and port of Fedhala. Other objectives were to silence the coastal batteries, capture the roads and rail lines around Fedhala, and move south in order to surround Casablanca.

Landings 
The landings took place on a stretch of coastline between the Nefifikh and Mellah rivers. Singular battalion landing teams landed on four separate beaches within this four-mile-long zone.

Five coastal and antiaircraft batteries fired shells ranging from 75-mm to 138.6-mm in caliber. 2,500 garrison troops were stationed in Fedhala, along with 4,325 at Casablanca. Surrounding airfields could potentially supply up to fifty fighters and thirty bombers.

See also 
 7th Infantry Regiment
 15th Infantry Regiment
 30th Infantry Regiment
 3rd Infantry Division
 67th Armored Regiment (1st Battalion)
 82nd Armored Reconnaissance Battalion
 2nd Armored Division
 756th Tank Battalion

Footnotes 

Battles and operations of World War II
Conflicts in 1942
Military history of Morocco
Morocco in World War II
North African campaign